Gene Demby is an American journalist. He is lead blogger on NPR’s race, ethnicity and culture team Code Switch and cohost of the podcast by the same title. He's also the founder of the blog PostBourgie and its accompanying podcast.

Early life
Demby grew up in South Philadelphia, and attended Hofstra University.

Career
Prior to joining NPR, Demby worked for The New York Times and then as managing editor for Huffington Post's BlackVoices vertical.

NPR Code Switch 

Demby debuted the NPR project Code Switch on April 7, 2013 with an introductory essay that met with immediate acclaim; writing at Complex, Jason Parham said that if the essay "'How Code-Switching Explains The World' is any indication of the content to come, we couldn't be more excited."

In 2016, Demby and cohost Shereen Marisol Meraji debuted what Harvard's Neiman Lab called "the long-awaited podcast" from Code Switch.

PostBourgie blog

Demby began blogging in 2004. Speaking to ColorLines in 2012, Demby said he'd been motivated by frustration with media conversations about race, mentioning in particular an occasion a CNN reporter approached him on a basketball court to ask for comment on Bill Cosby's Pound Cake speech at the 2004 NAACP Image Awards. Demby recalled, "I pushed back on him pretty hard...There are people who think black people's condition in the world would be better if we just looked better. 'Pull up your pants.' It seemed so petty that we were having these conversations." In search of an alternative, in 2007 Demby founded a collective blog on race, culture, politics and media called PostBourgie, inviting friends to collaborate who shared his desire "to have conversations that assumed that black people were human beings who were complicated and imperfect, a space that wasn't super didactic."

Speaking to New York Magazine, Jamil Smith cited PostBourgie as one of the blogs that "really set the bar for...spaces that were made available to [African-Americans and other people of color]. Even if you were working for traditional media, you didn’t have the opportunity to offer your perspective, to tell the unvarnished version of the truth that you see every day...it really hearkens back to the tradition of the black press." In The Washington Post, Alyssa Rosenberg praised PostBourgie's accomplishments in "building a ladder for all its participants. The blog gave the people who wrote there a chance to workshop their voices and refine their ideas for a smart audience, even when they didn’t have paying assignments for an idea. When one PostBourgie writer got a new job, he or she encouraged others to freelance for that new outlet and to apply for fellowships and jobs there." PostBourgie alums have included Shani O. Hilton, now executive editor of news for BuzzFeed, and BuzzFeed writers Joel Anderson and Tracy Clayton.

Demby hosts an accompanying podcast also called PostBourgie.

Awards
In 2009, Demby's PostBourgie won a Black Weblog Award for Best News/Politics Site.

In 2013 and again in 2014, Demby was named to The Root 100's list of the 100 most important black influencers.

In 2014, Demby and the Code Switch team won the Online News Association's award for Best Online Commentary.

Personal life
Demby is married to fellow journalist Kainaz Amaria, a Zoroastrian American who is currently a visuals editor for Vox Media. The couple live in Washington.

References

Living people
African-American journalists
American male journalists
African-American writers
American podcasters
NPR personalities
Hofstra University alumni
The Lawrence Herbert School of Communication alumni
Year of birth missing (living people)
21st-century African-American people